Špitalič pri Slovenskih Konjicah is a small village in the Municipality of Slovenske Konjice in the Styria region of Slovenia.

The church in the village, dedicated to the Visitation of the Blessed Virgin Mary, is the only remaining part of the Ecclesia minor (lay monastery) associated with the nearby Carthusian monastery.

References

External links
Špitalič pri Slovenskih Konjicah at Geopedia

Populated places in the Municipality of Slovenske Konjice